The Adeyfield Academy (formerly Adeyfield School) is an 11–18 mixed, secondary school and sixth form with academy status in Adeyfield, Hemel Hempstead, Hertfordshire, England. It is part of the Atlas Multi Academy Trust.

The school was founded in 1953, initially as a secondary modern school and is now an all ability - comprehensive school.

The school works in consortium with two neighbouring schools to enhance post-16 provision. The consortium consists of Adeyfield School, Astley Cooper School and Longdean School. Staff development and wellbeing is also coordinated at consortium level.

The school has many awards including an International Schools Status. As a result of this, a club called "The YEC", standing for "Young Earth Citizen" was formed to link Adeyfield with other schools around the world. One project that they work on is to write articles for an online magazine.

Uniform 
Adeyfield was one of the last secondary schools to have school jumpers. This changed in late 2007 to school ties (of the school colours, jade green and silver) white shirts and black blazers.

Housing system 
The school has a total of 4 houses that all students are shorted into. In these houses students have the opportunity to win house points that going into a collective for their house. They can do this by earning golden stars, achievement points, participating in house events and sports day. At the end of the academic year the points are tallied up and a award is given to the house who has achieved the most. The houses are:

 Parks = Red house = Named after Rosa Parks
 Mandela = Yellow house = Named after Nelson Mandela 
 Einstein = Blue house = Named after Albert Einstein
 Whitlock = Green house. Named after local gymnast Max Whitlock

References

External links
 
 http://thegloalyec.org.uk

Secondary schools in Hertfordshire
Academies in Hertfordshire
Dacorum
Educational institutions established in 1953
1953 establishments in England